The Maxies are a power pop/punk rock band based in Riverside, California, with its members using onstage pseudonyms and billing themselves from Nuuk, Greenland. Prone to juvenile obscenities, the band is known for their catchy sing-along pop punk tunes, on-stage antics, and drunken polar bear mascot. 
Because of their costumes and gimmicks, they are often likened to an evil, bad guy version of The Aquabats. Their live show is usually over the top making fun of themselves, the audience and any bands on the show. These Anti-Heros will have you laughing and dancing at the same time. The band signed to Rock Ridge Music with distribution by ADA / Warner Bros., and released their second full-length album, Nuuk 'Em All, on April 22, 2016.

The band's music is largely influenced by Ramones, The Jam, Green Day, The Specials, They Might Be Giants, The Purple Hearts, The Clash, Paul Collins and his band The Beat, with whom they have toured, along with other bands such as Reel Big Fish, Big D and the Kids Table, Suburban Legends, and Streetlight Manifesto. Notable fan Aaron Barrett of Reel Big Fish has occasionally dressed up in the polar bear suit and played as a guitarist for The Maxies. Barrett has played guitar, sang backups and produced on The Maxies' album Nuuk 'Em All. Most of their physical releases have been put out by It's Alive Records, and the cover of their 7" split with Japanese band Kingons was drawn by DC Comics artist Tim Cochran. The identities of the band members are officially unknown, but it is rumored that one member was formerly a part of the band Squirtgun.

Major tours 
 Streetlight Manifesto and Reel Big Fish 2011
 Goldfinger, Reel Big Fish, Big D and the Kids Table, Suburban Legends 2012
 The Beat 2013
 Reel Big Fish and Suburban Legends 2014
 Japan tour with Kingons 2014
 Reel Big Fish and Suburban Legends 2016

Discography
{| class="wikitable"
|-
|Date of US release
|Title
|Label
|-
|2010
|The Unofficial Punk Rock Bowling Demos'''
|(self release) (Digital/CD)
|-
|2011
|Going Clubbin|It's Alive Records (Digital/Vinyl/CD)
|-
|2013
|Greenland is Melting
|It's Alive Records (Digital/Vinyl/CD)
|-
|2013
|The Beat/The Maxies 7" Split
|Radius Records (Vinyl)
|-
|2014
|The Maxies/Kingons 10" Split
|It's Alive Records (Digital/Vinyl/CD)
|-
|2016
|Nuuk 'Em All
|Rock Ridge Music / ADA / Warner Bros. 
|}Compilation appearancesAwesome Fest 4 2010 "The Party's Over...Now"
Show 'Em the Hand II - It's Alive Records 2011 "Clubbin'," "Sandy"
12th and G  - On the Real Records 2011 "Baby Defect"
Awesome Fest 666 2012 "A Global Warming"
Awesome Fiesta Siete 7 2013 "Happy Birthday [You're a Dick]"Music videos'''
Feliz Navidad - 2013

References

External links
 

Musical groups established in 2006
Bands with fictional stage personas
Musical groups from Riverside County, California
Pop punk groups from California